69 may refer to: 
 69 (number)
 A year, primarily 69 BC, AD 69, 1969, or 2069
69 (sex position)

Arts and media

Music
 69, a 1988 album by A.R. Kane
 "'69", a song by Deep Purple from Abandon
 Major 6 add 9, a jazz chord
 "Summer of '69", a song by Bryan Adams
 6ix9ine, also known as Tekashi69, American rapper
 Day69, album by 6ix9ine
 "69", a song by T-Pain from his 2007 album Epiphany

Other media
69, a novel by Ryu Murakami
69, a 2004 film based on the Murakami novel

Other uses
 Lake 69, a small lake in the region of Áncash, Peru
 *69, the Last Call Return feature code in the US and Canada
 List of highways numbered 69
 Texas State Highway 112, formerly designated as State Highway 69
 ♋️, the symbol for the astrological sign Cancer
 British Rail Class 69, a class of locomotive converted from the ageing British Rail Class 56.

See also
 "34+35", a 2020 song by Ariana Grande